Sesame Street: Cookie's Counting Carnival is a Sesame Street video game developed by American company Black Lantern Studios, released on October 19, 2010, from Warner Bros. Interactive Entertainment for the Microsoft Windows, the Wii, and Nintendo DS. It also shared the same release date, developer and platforms as Sesame Street: Elmo's A-to-Zoo Adventure.

The Nintendo versions use motion controls via the Wii Remote or touchscreen, and are packaged with special plush covers for the Wii Remote or Nintendo DS stylus to make it more comfortable to hold for players of the game's intended age.  The Windows version is primarily played with point and click mouse controls.

Gameplay
There are twelve game modes to play, as well as fourteen minigames.

References

2010 video games
Nintendo DS games
Sesame Street video games
Video games developed in the United States
Warner Bros. video games
Wii games
Windows games
Children's educational video games
Black Lantern Studios games
Multiplayer and single-player video games